Kham Nai was king of the southern Laotian Kingdom of Champasak from 1856 to 1858.

Kings of Champasak
19th-century Laotian people